The discography of the Serbian and former Yugoslav rock band Partibrejkers consists of seven studio albums, two live albums, two compilation albums, one single, one video album, and several various artists compilation appearances.

Studio albums

Live albums

Compilation albums

Singles

Other appearances

Video albums

References 

 EX YU ROCK enciklopedija 1960-2006, Janjatović Petar; 
 Partibrejkers discography at Discogs

Discographies of Serbian artists
Rock music group discographies